Hohenstein may refer to:

People 
 Adolfo Hohenstein (1854–1928), German painter, advertiser, illustrator
 Rory Hohenstein, American ballet dancer
 Wes Hohenstein, American television meteorologist

Places
 Hohenstein (Reutlingen), a municipality in Baden-Württemberg, Germany
 Hohenstein (Strausberg), a civil parish of Strausberg, Brandenburg, Germany
 Hohenstein, Hesse, Germany
 Hohenstein, Thuringia, Germany
 Hohenstein-Ernstthal, Saxony, Germany
 Olsztynek, Poland, called Hohenstein in German
 Sayn-Wittgenstein-Hohenstein, a county of the Holy Roman Empire (1657–1806)

Other uses 
 Hohenstein Institute